Dana Lamont Williams (born March 20, 1963) is an American former professional baseball player. He appeared in eight games in the Major League Baseball (MLB) as a backup outfielder, designated hitter and pinch runner for the Boston Red Sox during the  season.

Career
Williams graduated from Davidson High School (Mobile, Alabama) and was signed by the Red Sox as an undrafted free agent out of Enterprise State Community College.

In six MLB plate appearances and five at bats, Williams was a .200 hitter (1-for-5) with a double and one run scored.  His double came in the only game he ever started for Boston, on June 25 as the designated hitter in a 7–0 loss to the Minnesota Twins, off left-handed starting pitcher Allan Anderson.
 
Williams also played in the Red Sox, White Sox and Cubs minor league systems from 1983 through 1990, hitting .291 with 37 home runs and 265 runs batted in in 845 games.  He later played independent league baseball in 1993 and 1996.

See also
1989 Boston Red Sox season
Boston Red Sox all-time roster

External  links
The Baseball Cube
Baseball Reference

1963 births
Living people
African-American baseball players
American expatriate baseball players in Canada
Baseball players from Alabama
Baseball players from West Virginia
Boston Red Sox players
Charlotte Knights players
Duluth-Superior Dukes players
Elmira Pioneers players
Major League Baseball designated hitters
Major League Baseball left fielders
Minor league baseball coaches
New Britain Red Sox players
Pawtucket Red Sox players
Sioux City Explorers players
Sportspeople from Mobile, Alabama
Vancouver Canadians players
Winston-Salem Spirits players
Enterprise State Boll Weevils baseball players